Kasumbalesa is a border town in  the Democratic Republic of the Congo. It sits across the international border from the much smaller town of Kasumbalesa, Zambia.

Location
The geographical coordinates of Kasumbalesa are: 12°15'23.0"S, 27°48'10.0"E (Latitude:-12.256389; Longitude:27.802778).

Population
The national census, conducted on 1 July 1984, enumerated the population of the town at 31,773 people. As of 1 July 2004, the town's population was estimated at 47,213.
 The 1984 census data is sourced from the National Institute of Statistics of the Democratic Republic of the Congo.
 The 2004 population estimate is sourced from the United Nations Organization Stabilization Mission in the Democratic Republic of the Congo.

Overview
Kasumbalesa is a major crossing point for both human traffic and cargo for both Democratic Republic of the Congo and Zambia. It is the main conduit of trade that amounted to US$575 million that DR Congo imported from Zambia compared to US$1.7 billion that Zambia imported from its northern neighbor, based on 2015 data. An average of over 500 long-haul cargo trucks are cleared daily in each direction. In April 2019, the traffic at the border crossing snarled, leading to congestion on both sides of the border.

See also
 Southern African Development Community

References

External links
Kasumbalesa Border Post (ZAM/DRC) 06h00-18h00 As of 16 May 2019.

Populated places in Haut-Katanga Province
Democratic Republic of the Congo–Zambia border crossings